.to is the Internet country code top-level domain (ccTLD) of the Kingdom of Tonga.

The government of Tonga sells domains in its ccTLD to any interested party.  The .to ccTLD is administered by the Tonga Network Information Center (Tonic).

Background 
The .to top-level domain was widely commercialized in 1997 by the San Francisco company Tonic Corp. (www.tonic.to, founded by Eric Gullichsen and Eric Lyons) which would sell domains at $100 per unit. They operated with the approval of the Prince of Tonga. Network Solutions was already selling .to domains, but in a very chaotic fashion. Domain requests were processed by the Tongan consulate in San Francisco.

The top-level domain to itself had an A record and an HTTP server since at least 1998.

Description 
Because to is a common English preposition, it became popular to craft memorable URLs called domain hacks that take advantage of this; URL shortening/redirection services (e.g. go.to) are a popular use. Other domain hacks do not use the to as a preposition but rather as a syllable inside of a word, including Daniel J. Bernstein's website cr.yp.to, London web development company Potato p.ota.to.

"T.O." (tee-oh) is also a common nickname for Toronto, Ontario, Canada, and is used as a city domain as exemplified by popular Toronto sites Budtender.to (Cannabis Dispensary Reviews) and Jobs.to (Job Bank Toronto).  This domain is also used for the city of Torino (Turin), Italy, and also as a domain hack in Slavic languages (to meaning it or that) – such as the uploading service uloz.to ("ulož to" means "save it" in Czech and Slovak).

As the .to domains are purchased, all normal DNS operations are possible and registered sites are not required to display ads on behalf of the registrar. Some domains are free, like .edu.to, but only to real Tongan educational institutions. At this moment businesses registered in Tonga can also get free domains. People who sell on .to domains can claim a commission.

.to is one of the few ccTLDs that (officially) do not maintain a (public) WHOIS database providing registrant information.  It is possible to contact domain registrants via tonic.to by typing the domain in the domain search field under "New Domain Name". This has resulted in limited popularity for the use of .to for websites involved in copyright infringement.

The .to registry allows the creation of emoji domain names and the .to registrar, Register.TO, supports the search and registration of .to emoji domain names.

References

External links
Registration of .TO domains
 IANA .to whois information
Registration of Emoji Domains

Computer-related introductions in 1995
Communications in Tonga
Country code top-level domains
Domain hacks

sv:Toppdomän#T